W. P. Davidson High School is a four-year senior high school located in Mobile, Alabama. The school operates in the Mobile County Public School System.

The school serves a section of Tillmans Corner.

There are roughly 1,700 students and 110–125 staff members at the school.

History
The birth of W.P. Davidson High School was in 1960 when a tenth-grade class was contained in the building of the Azalea Road Junior High School. Each year an additional grade was included, until the 1962–1963 school year when Davidson graduated its first class. That same year the modern building, which previously had been only a dream to Davidson students, became a reality. The much envied seniors were given the esteemed privilege of attending classes in the new structure during the last two weeks of school. The dedication of W.P. Davidson was during September. The first full year was the 1963–1964 session, in which case four grades, Freshman - Seniors, were taught.

W.P. Davidson High School is a four-year secondary education institution in the Mobile County Public School System. Davidson offers one of the most comprehensive programs available to Mobile students. Davidson was selected as a National Blue Ribbon School in the National Committee on Excellence in Education Secondary School Recognition Program in 1990–1991 and in 1994–1996. In 1992 W.P. Davidson High School was the recipient of Redbook magazine's Best Schools Program National Academic Achievement Winner. Davidson boasts a long tradition of academic excellence and extracurricular activities. Davidson serves an average population of 1400 students, with 85 teachers, counselors, librarians, and administrators. Davidson is accredited by the Southeastern Association of Colleges and Schools and the state of Alabama. Davidson's air-conditioned school plant is located on a 36-acre campus in west Mobile.

The "Warriors" is the school's mascot. This "Warrior" is a Native American chief and a capital D with an arrow is used for its logos.

Engineering Pathways Integrated Curriculum (EPIC)
Davidson's EPIC program attracts students from throughout Mobile County and offers courses in mechanical, electrical and chemical engineering. Students can also take engineering-focused math, science and drafting courses. The program requires its major students to complete five math or science courses in addition to the four math and four science courses required by the State of Alabama. Senior majors are required to complete Advance Placement Physics and Advance Placement Calculus AB. EPIC minors pursue a less rigorous course load in preparation for jobs in industry and technology.

International Baccalaureate
In November 2007, Davidson High School became an International Baccalaureate World School. The school is one of two state funded, international baccalaureate high schools in the Mobile County Public School System. Davidson High School is a founding member of IBSA (IB Schools of Alabama). Freshmen and sophomores at Davidson take preparatory classes and begin the IB program as juniors.

Technical school
Davidson also participates in accordance with the Bryant Career Technical Center in Irvington, Alabama to help prepare students to prepare for future career paths such as Heath related professions, and HVAC Technicians.

Robotics
Davidson participates in BEST Robotics. The team, RobotEx, has experienced success in the program.

School uniform
Davidson High School has a mandatory school uniform policy.
White button down oxford shirt, khaki pants, black belt and black shoes. Black sweatshirts must be from a Davidson club or an all black sweatshirt.

Feeder patterns
The following middle schools feed into Davidson High School:

Portions of the attendance zone:
 Denton Middle School, formally Azalea Road Middle School
 Pillans Middle School
 Washington Middle School
 Burns Middle School (as of 2007)
 Calloway-Smith Middle School (before the 2012–2013 School Year)

Notable alumni
Jason Caffey, former NBA player
Cooper Huckabee (Class of 1969), Hollywood actor
J.J. Johnson, Miami Dolphins
Brandon Maye, American football linebacker
Freddie Robinson, former defensive back of the Indianapolis Colts
Gregory Slay, Former drummer for Remy Zero
Jaquiski Tartt, former defensive back of the San Francisco 49ers
Richard Todd, former quarterback of the New York Jets
Richard Tyson, Hollywood actor
Jimmie Ward, defensive back of the San Francisco 49ers
Dana Williams, Former MLB player (Boston Red Sox)

References

External links
 Davidson High School

High schools in Mobile, Alabama
Educational institutions established in 1960
Public high schools in Alabama
1960 establishments in Alabama